Koppe is a genus of liocranid sac spiders first described by Christa L. Deeleman-Reinhold in 2001.

Species
 it contains thirteen species throughout Southeast Asia:
Koppe armata (Simon, 1896) – Sri Lanka
Koppe baerti Deeleman-Reinhold, 2001 – Indonesia (Sulawesi)
Koppe calciphila Deeleman-Reinhold, 2001 – Indonesia (Sulawesi)
Koppe doleschalli Deeleman-Reinhold, 2001 – Indonesia (Moluccas)
Koppe kinabalensis Deeleman-Reinhold, 2001 – Borneo
Koppe kuntneri Deeleman-Reinhold, 2001 – Indonesia (Moluccas)
Koppe minuta Deeleman-Reinhold, 2001 – Indonesia (Java, Sumatra)
Koppe montana Deeleman-Reinhold, 2001 (type) – Indonesia (Java)
Koppe no Deeleman-Reinhold, 2001 – Indonesia (Sulawesi)
Koppe princeps Deeleman-Reinhold, 2001 – Indonesia (Sulawesi)
Koppe radiata (Thorell, 1881) – New Guinea
Koppe sumba Deeleman-Reinhold, 2001 – Indonesia (Lesser Sunda Is.)
Koppe tinikitkita (Barrion & Litsinger, 1995) – Philippines

References

Araneomorphae genera
Liocranidae
Spiders of Asia